The Sunday Times Fast Track 100 was an annual league table published in association with The Sunday Times newspaper in the UK. It ranks Britain's 100 private companies with the fastest-growing sales over the last three years. It is published in The Sunday Times each December, with a conference and awards event typically held in May, and alumni dinners during the year. The list is researched and produced by Fast Track, an Oxford-based research and networking events business. Sir Richard Branson and the Virgin Group have supported the Fast Track 100 league table since Hamish Stevenson founded Fast Track in 1997.

About Fast Track 
Fast Track is a leading research and events company that has built a network of the UK's top-performing private companies, from the fastest-growing to the biggest, through its rankings in The Sunday Times. Founded in 1997 by Hamish Stevenson, it now publishes seven annual league tables and brings company founders and directors together at invitation-only networking awards events and alumni dinners.

Entry criteria 
Companies have to meet the criteria below to be able to enter the Fast Track 100 league table:

 UK registered, unquoted, and not subsidiary
 Sales of at least £250,000 in the base year of trading (latest year minus 3 years)
 Sales of at least £5m in the latest year
Ten or more employees in the latest year
 Operating profit of at least £500,00 in the latest year
Year-on-year sales growth in the latest year
Trading weeks in the base and latest years have to exceed 25
Recruitment firms, payroll services providers, energy firms and media agencies are required to have gross profits of at least £5m. Sales for recruitment and payroll firms are the total amount invoiced to clients; media agencies' sales are net of advertising spend on behalf of clients

Companies that do not meet all the criteria can still be considered for the Ones to Watch programme, particularly if they forecast good sales growth.

Exclusions

 Technology, digital media and telecoms (TMT) companies (which appear on Tech Track 100)
 LLPs, pure property and financial trading companies, and companies with sales of over £500m

Limitations 
The Fast Track 100 league table is promoted as the definitive guide to the fastest growing privately held companies in the UK, with Richard Branson describing it as "the barometer of private company growth" However, the research limitations  - most small private companies do not file accounts - mean that the list may not cover all fast growing private companies.

Sales figures filed in accounts with Companies House also reflect a trading period ending up to ten months prior to filing. The majority of sales figures published in Fast Track 100 are more up to date than that. For instance, on the 2019 Fast Track 100 league table, 65 companies supplied Fast Track with a sales figure for their latest year of trading that was not available at Companies House; 35 companies had filed accounts, but in many instances their prior years' trading figures were not publicly available, making it impossible to calculate their sales growth over a number of years.

Notable alumni companies 

Fast Track 100 is responsible for the early identification of a number of household names, including Carphone Warehouse, Boden and Travelex, innocent and Fever-Tree. The first Fast Track 100 league table in 1997 featured ARM Holdings with sales of just £17 million. It was sold to SoftBank for in 2016 for £24.4 billion.

More recently Fast Track 100 has tracked the progress of a new generation of private companies such as craft brewer Brewdog, beauty products retailer Charlotte Tilbury, and gym group PureGym.

Latest Fast Track 100 list 
The 24th annual Sunday Times Virgin Atlantic Fast Track 100 league table supplement was published on 6 December 2020 and featured companies such as BrewDog, reusable bottle brand Chilly's Bottles, fitness clothing retailer Gymshark, online jewellery brand Missoma and designer menswear retailer END.

2019 Top 100 rankings

Previous rankings

2018 Top 20 rankings

2017 Top 20 rankings

2016 Abbreviated rankings

2015 Abbreviated rankings

2013 Abbreviated rankings

2012 Abbreviated rankings

2011 Abbreviated rankings

2010 Abbreviated rankings

2009 Abbreviated rankings

2008 Abbreviated rankings

2007 Abbreviated rankings

Other Fast Track publications 
Fast Track 100 is one of seven league tables of private companies produced by Fast Track and published in The Sunday Times:
Fast Track 100 – ranks the UK's fastest-growing private companies based on sales (excluding TMT companies, which appear in Tech Track 100 (see below)
SME Export Track 100 – ranks the UK's SMEs with the fastest-growing international sales
Tech Track 100 – ranks the UK's fastest-growing private technology companies based on sales (the sister table to Fast Track 100) 
 International Track 200 – ranks the UK's private mid-market companies with the fastest-growing overseas sales
 Profit Track 100 – ranks the UK's private companies with the fastest-growing profits 
Top Track 250 – ranks the UK's leading mid-market private companies based on sales and/or profits growth
Top Track 100 – ranks the UK's biggest private companies based on sales

References 

Top lists
The Sunday Times (UK)